EuroIntervention is a peer-reviewed medical journal covering research in the field of percutaneous and surgical cardiovascular interventions. It is the official journal of EuroPCR and the European Association of Percutaneous Coronary Interventions. The editor-in-chief is Davide Capodanno.

Abstracting and indexing
The journal is abstracted and indexed in Science Citation Index Expanded, MEDLINE, and Scopus. According to the Journal Citation Reports, the journal has a 2021 impact factor of 7,728.

References

External links

Cardiology journals
English-language journals
Publications established in 2006